, better known by the stage names  and , is a Japanese voice actress and kōdan-shi known for voicing Masao Sato in Crayon Shin-chan, Sumire Sakura in Chibi Maruko-chan and Shinbee Fukutomi in Nintama Rantaro. She was born in Osaka.

Filmography

Television animation
 Miss Machiko (1981–83) - Maruko
 Captain Tsubasa (1983–86) - Hikaru Matsuyama, Hanji Urabe, Tsuyoshi Oda
 Fist of the North Star (1984) - Bat
 Princess Sarah (1985) - Becky
 Ganbare, Kickers! (1986–87) - Naoto Hamamoto
 Saint Seiya (1986) - Daichi (Steel Saint of Fox)
 Mister Ajikko (1986–90) - Naoto Hamamoto
 Oishinbo (1988–92) - Kanezawa, Keiko Mizoki
 Shin Captain Tsubasa (1989–90) - Hikaru Matsuyama, Hanji Urabe
 Sally the Witch 2 (1989-90) - Yoshiko Hanamura
 Chibi Maruko-chan (1990–) - Sumire Sakura, Futoshi Kosugi
 Marude Dameo (1991) - Norori
 21 Emon (1991–92) - Mie
 Crayon Shin-chan (1992–) - Masao
 Nintama Rantarou (1993–) - Shinbee Fukutomi
 Waka Okami wa Shōgakusei! (2018) - Etsuko Tajima
 Isekai Izakaya "Nobu" (2018) - Narrator

Original video animation (OVA)
Devilman The Demon Bird (1990) (Tare-chan)
Ozanari Dungeon (1991) (Mocha)
Jungle Wars (1991) (Sasuke)

Theatrical animation
Mobile Suit Gundam F91 (1991) (Manuela Panopa)
Crayon Shin-chan series (1993–present) (Masao)
Waka Okami wa Shōgakusei! (2018)

Video games
Captain Tsubasa: Dream Team (2017)  - Hikaru Matsuyama, Hanji Urabe

Tokusatsu
Singing Great Ryūgū-jō (1992) - Amberjack Origin (ep. 10)

Dubbed roles

Live-action
Julie Walters
Harry Potter and the Philosopher's Stone – Molly Weasley
Harry Potter and the Prisoner of Azkaban – Molly Weasley
Harry Potter and the Order of the Phoenix – Molly Weasley
Harry Potter and the Half-Blood Prince – Molly Weasley
Harry Potter and the Deathly Hallows – Part 1 – Molly Weasley
Harry Potter and the Deathly Hallows – Part 2 – Molly Weasley
Bad Teacher – Lynn Davies (Phyllis Smith)

Animation
Cow and Chicken – Cow
Hotel Transylvania 2 – Linda

References

External links

1958 births
Voice actresses from Osaka Prefecture
Japanese voice actresses
Living people